Iorwerth "Iorrie" Hughes (26 May 1925 – 20 August 1993) was a Welsh international football goalkeeper.

Hughes was born in Abergele, and began his career with Llandudno in the 1948–49 season. He went on to play for Luton Town, Cardiff City and Newport County. He was part of the Wales national football team between 1950 and 1951, playing four matches. He played his first international match on 15 November 1950 against England and his last on 16 May 1951 against Switzerland.

See also
 List of Wales international footballers (alphabetical)

References

1925 births
1993 deaths
People from Abergele
Sportspeople from Conwy County Borough
Welsh footballers
Wales international footballers
Llandudno F.C. players
Luton Town F.C. players
Cardiff City F.C. players
Newport County A.F.C. players
Place of birth missing
Association football goalkeepers